Wyle Laboratories (Wyle) is an American privately held provider of engineering, scientific and technical services to the Department of Defense, NASA, and a variety of commercial customers primarily in the aerospace industry. The company offers services in the areas of test and evaluation; systems engineering and information technology; life cycle and acquisition program management; life sciences research; space medical operations and engineering; and qualification testing for systems and components.

Founded in 1949, the company is still headquartered in El Segundo, California, and has approximately 4,800 employees at more than 50 facilities nationwide. Wyle comprises three primary operating entities: Aerospace Group, CAS Group, and Integrated Science, Technology, and Engineering Group. Annual revenue is approximately $1.1 billion.

History
Founded in 1949 by Frank S. Wyle (1919–2016) as part of the rapidly expanding Southern California aerospace industry, Wyle Laboratories, Inc. began operations in El Segundo, California as a testing laboratory. Frank S. Wyle was married to Edith R. Wyle and is the grandfather of actor Noah Wyle and artist Sonia Romero.

Over time, the company diversified into a variety of markets and businesses. Through a buy-out in 1995, the company was split into Wyle Electronics and the Scientific Services and Systems Group, which continued to operate as Wyle Laboratories. In 2007, the company decided to simplify its name to Wyle since its primary business focus had evolved into a range of services. It still operates laboratories, but its primary business focus is on securing long term services contracts from the Department of Defense, NASA and other Federal agencies.

In 1998, Wyle acquired Krug Life Sciences, an aero-medical research company with 30-plus years of history supporting NASA's manned space flight programs. In January 2005, Wyle acquired the General Dynamics Aeronautics division, formerly a part of Veridian, adding aviation research, development, test and evaluation (RDT&E) expertise to the Company's portfolio.

In 2008, Wyle acquired RS Information Systems, which today is the Company's third primary business group, providing services as Wyle Information Systems Group. The acquisition brought total annual revenue to $800 million and the total number of employees to 4,200, giving Wyle an additional presence in the Washington D.C. "Beltway" area. In a subsequent reorganization, Wyle's heritage Test, Engineering and Research Group was folded into the Aerospace Group, returning the organization to three primary business groups, but with an emphasis on aerospace and IT systems rather than independent test and evaluation. The unit was subsequently split off again in late 2010 and operates as an independent unit within Wyle.

In May 2009, Wyle entered into a merger agreement to be acquired by Court Square Capital Partners, an investment company which is now the majority shareholder.

In September 2010, Wyle bought the CAS unit from ITT and organized it as the company's fourth operating group. The CAS Group provides a range of services to the U.S. Army and related customers.

In 2016, KBR purchased Wyle for $570 million becoming KBRwyle

Facilities
 Norco, California cryogenic facility

Service areas

 Acoustics Research and Consulting
 Air Quality Research and Consulting
 Acquisition Program Management
 Clinical and Occupational Health Services
 Design and Construction of Advanced Test Equipment
 Foreign Military Sales Case Management
 Information Technology 
 Life Cycle Management
 Life Sciences Research
 Non-destructive Inspection
 Science and Mission Integration
 Space Flight Hardware Development and Fabrication
 Space Launch and Operations Support
 Space Medical Operations
 Systems Engineering
 Telemetry and Data Systems
 Test pilot and Test Aircrew Services

References

External links
 
Battling Fire and Ice: remote guidance ultrasound to diagnose injury on the International Space Station and the ice rink: http://www.ajsfulltextonline.com/article/S0002-9610%2806%2900802-6/abstract
Evaluation of Shoulder Integrity in Space: First Report of Musculoskeletal US on the International Space Station: http://radiology.rsna.org/content/234/2/319.abstract
A Pilot Study of Comprehensive Ultrasound Education at the Wayne State University School of Medicine: http://www.jultrasoundmed.org/cgi/content/abstract/27/5/745

Commercial laboratories
Defense companies of the United States
Laboratories in California
Technology companies based in Greater Los Angeles
Companies based in El Segundo, California
American companies established in 1949
Technology companies established in 1949
1949 establishments in California